Ed Kemmer (October 29, 1921 – November 9, 2004) was an American motion picture and television actor.

Life
Kemmer was born in Reading, Pennsylvania as Edward William Kemmerer, and served as a fighter pilot in World War II. He was shot down over France and spent 11 months in a POW camp. He briefly escaped from the camp for two weeks before he was recaptured.

Kemmer made his television debut in 1951 and starred as Buzz Corry in the live television science fiction action-drama Space Patrol (1951-1956).   Kemmer made his film debut in 1956 (Behind the High Wall).  He had a starring role as a pilot in the film The Hot Angel (1958), but his big-screen work was mostly small roles in low-budget B movies such as Giant from the Unknown (1958).  The bulk of Kemmer's work was for the small screen.

After Space Patrol, Kemmer was a guest star in various prime-time television series,  including the classic Twilight Zone episode "Nightmare at 20,000 Feet", in which former space hero Kemmer co-starred with future space hero William Shatner. He also made two guest appearances on Perry Mason. In 1960 he played Roger Porter in "The Case of the Frantic Flyer," and in 1961 he played murder victim Leslie Hall in "The Case of the Pathetic Patient."
In 1964 he played a major part in ”The Impostor”, a tense Sutton Roley-directed episode of Combat! (S3, E10).

Kemmer starred for two years as an American astronaut in the soap opera The Clear Horizon, leading to the later phase of his career as a leading player in various daytime drama series, including The Edge of Night (on which he met his wife, actress Fran Sharon) as Malcolm Thomas, The Secret Storm as Paul Britton #2, As the World Turns as attorney Dick Martin, and 
Somerset as attorney Ben Grant.  He also made appearances as a doctor on All My Children.

In 1962, Kemmer was cast as the historical investigative journalist Henry Morton Stanley in the episode, "The Truth Teller,"  on the syndicated television Anthology series, Death Valley Days, hosted by Stanley Andrews. The episode is a study of the Medicine Lodge Indian Peace Treaty. Stanley  arrives at Fort Larned, Kansas, to assess Hancock's effort to avoid war on the frontier. Charles Carlson filled the role of Wild Bill Hickok, long after Guy Madison played Hickok in a weekly syndicated series.

Kemmer was twice married and had three children, Jonathan, Todd, and Kimberly.

On November 5, 2004, Kemmer had a stroke in New York City; he died four days later.

Filmography

References

Edward Kemmer acted in S4 E22 of the TV western Rawhide.

External links

1921 births
2004 deaths
American male television actors
American male film actors
20th-century American male actors
United States Army Air Forces pilots of World War II
World War II prisoners of war held by Germany
Actors from Reading, Pennsylvania
Male actors from Los Angeles
American World War II fighter pilots
Shot-down aviators
American prisoners of war in World War II
Military personnel from Pennsylvania